Izquierda Unida ("United Left") is the name of a number of political parties or coalitions in Spanish-speaking countries:

 United Left (Argentina)
 United Left (Peru)
 United Left (Spain)

See also
 United Left (disambiguation)